John A. Hoffman (born January 17, 1965) is a Minnesota politician and member of the Minnesota Senate. A member of the Minnesota Democratic–Farmer–Labor Party (DFL), he represents District 36, which includes parts of Anoka and Hennepin County.

Early career
Before being elected to the Minnesota Legislature, Hoffman served as a member of the Anoka-Hennepin School District Board, beginning in 2005.

Before that he was a member of the Federal Interagency Coordinating Council, assisting and advising Cabinet members on their response to children and families birth to eight, specifically those with special health care needs.

Minnesota Senate
Hoffman was first elected in 2012, defeating incumbent Benjamin Kruse. He was reelected in 2016, 2020, and 2022. In 2021, Hoffman became minority whip.

Hoffman serves on the following committees:

 Human Service Reform Finance and Policy
 Aging and Long-Term Care Policy

References

External links

Senator John Hoffman official Minnesota Senate website
Senator John Hoffman official campaign website

1965 births
Living people
Politicians from Casper, Wyoming
People from Champlin, Minnesota
School board members in Minnesota
Democratic Party Minnesota state senators
Saint Mary's University of Minnesota alumni
21st-century American politicians